Kenneth Bruce Reinsfield (born 4 February 1958) is a New Zealand wrestler. He competed in the men's freestyle 82 kg at the 1984 Summer Olympics. His younger brother Steve is also an Olympic wrestler.

References

1958 births
Living people
New Zealand male sport wrestlers
Olympic wrestlers of New Zealand
Wrestlers at the 1984 Summer Olympics
Sportspeople from Auckland
Commonwealth Games silver medallists for New Zealand
Commonwealth Games medallists in wrestling
Wrestlers at the 1978 Commonwealth Games
Wrestlers at the 1982 Commonwealth Games
Medallists at the 1982 Commonwealth Games